William Simpson (1878–1962) was an English professional footballer who made 143 appearances in the Football League playing for Sunderland and Lincoln City. He played as a left back or centre half.

Life and career
Simpson was born in Sunderland, which was then in County Durham, and played football for Wearside League club Selbourne before beginning his professional career with Sunderland A.F.C. He played only three times in the First Division, all in the 1898–99 season, and scored once, the winning goal five minutes from time as Sunderland won 2–1 at Bury. He remained with the club until 1902, when he moved to Second Division club Lincoln City. He spent six seasons with Lincoln, making 151 appearances in senior competition, without scoring.

Simpson died in 1962.

References

1878 births
1962 deaths
Footballers from Sunderland
English footballers
Association football forwards
Sunderland A.F.C. players
Lincoln City F.C. players
English Football League players
Date of birth missing
Date of death missing
Place of death missing